Vasyl Zhuk (born January 1, 1991) is a Ukrainian footballer who plays as a midfielder.

Playing career 
Zhuk began at the youth level in 2008 with BRV-VIK in Volodymyr. Shortly after he joined the professional ranks with FC Volyn Lutsk in the Ukrainian First League. He assisted Volyn in securing promotion to the Ukrainian Premier League in the 2009-10 season and made an appearance in 2011. He later played in the Ukrainian Amateur Football Championship in 2014 with FC Avanhard Zhydachiv. In 2015, he played abroad in the IV liga with LKS Szaflary.

He continued playing abroad this time in the Canadian Soccer League with Toronto Atomic the following season. In 2018, he played indoor soccer in the Arena Premier League with Ukraine AC. After a brief stint in the Arena Premier League, he signed with the Mississauga MetroStars in the Major Arena Soccer League. In 2019, he returned to the Canadian Soccer League to play with CSC Mississauga.

International career 
Zhuk made his international debut in 2007 with the Ukraine national under-16 football team and represented the Ukraine national under-17 football team and Ukraine national under-18 football team.

References 

1991 births
Living people
Ukrainian footballers
FC Volyn Lutsk players
FC Avanhard Zhydachiv players
Toronto Atomic FC players
Mississauga MetroStars players
Ukrainian First League players
Ukrainian Premier League players
Canadian Soccer League (1998–present) players
Major Arena Soccer League players
Association football midfielders
Expatriate soccer players in Canada
Ukrainian expatriate footballers
Ukrainian expatriate sportspeople in Canada
IV liga players